The 1959 Los Angeles Rams season was the team's 22nd year with the National Football League and the 14th season in Los Angeles.

Schedule

Standings

References

Los Angeles Rams
Los Angeles Rams seasons
Los Angeles